True Luv'  is the third album by Dutch girl group Luv', released in December 1979 by CNR/Carrere Records. It includes the hit singles "Ooh, Yes I Do" and "Ann-Maria" scored in the charts of European countries and also in a new territory: Mexico. In 1980, Luv's record company decided to re-issue the album by changing the track listing. The songs "Cloud nr.9" and "Let There Be Love" were replaced by "One More Little Kissie" (which was released as a single and became a hit record in Benelux) and "I Win It". In 2006, this LP has been reissued in digitally remastered form by Universal Music Netherlands as part of the Completely in Luv' box set.

Album history
In the summer of 1979, Luv' and its producers and songwriters (Hans van Hemert and Piet Souer) planned to leave Philips Records/Phonogram Records (the record company which had released the group's records for two years). José Hoebee, Patty Brard, Marga Scheide and their team signed a 750.000 Dutch guilder contract with CNR/Carrere Records. With this new deal considered by the newspaper De Telegraaf as "the show business transfer of the year", Luv's challenge was to prove that after one year and a half of mainstream success, the trio could still score hit records in the music charts.

The first album of the ladies released by CNR/Carrere was entitled True Luv. It was recorded at the famous Wisseloord Studios by the same team as the two previous albums, With Luv' (1978) and Lots of Luv' (1979). This opus is a mixture of Pop music, Disco, Latin American music sounds and Schlager, while its final track, "Let There Be Love" had a romantic sound and video that made the slow song distinctly similar to ABBA's "I Have a Dream".

Three songs taken from this LP were issued as singles. "Ooh, Yes I Do" and "Ann-Maria" were instant hits in the Benelux and Denmark, and reached the Top 50 in Germany and France. In order to reach the Latin American market, Spanish versions of these tracks were recorded and became successful in Mexico. The final track: "Let There Be Love" was also released on single, supported with a video, in 1979.

Track listing
All tracks written by Janschen & Janschens (aka Hans van Hemert & Piet Souer) unless otherwise noted.

Side A
"Ooh, Yes I Do" (Hans van Hemert) – 2:57
"Ann-Maria" (Piet Souer) – 4:40
"Rhythm 'n' Shoes" (van Hemert) – 3:07
"Flash" (van Hemert) – 3:51
"Boys Goodnight" (Souer) – 2:40
"Daddy, What a Life" (Souer) – 3:08

Side B
"Cloud Nr. 9" (van Hemert) – 3:25
"Wine, Women and Song" (van Hemert) – 3:45
"Getaway" (Souer) – 3:03
"Stop Me" (Souer) – 3:09
"My Guy" – 3:49
"Let There Be Love" – 2:39

1980 LP version and 2006 bonus tracks
True Luv''' was reissued in 1980 with changes in the track listing:
 "One More Little Kissie"  (Janschen & Janschens) – 3:50
This song replaced "Cloud nr.9", initially track #1, side 2
 "I Win It" (Janschen & Janschens) – 3:05
This song replaced "Let there be love", initially track #6, side 3True Luv was also remastered and reissued in 2006 as part of the Completely in Luv''' box set with the original 1979 track listing and three bonus tracks:
<LI>"Si, Que Si" (Alfred Garrido, Hans van Hemert) – 3:05
Spanish Version of Ooh, Yes I Do
<LI>"Ann-Maria" (Alfred Garrido, Piet Souer) – 4:04
Spanish version
<LI>"All You Need Is Luv' Jingle" (Janschen & Janschens) – 0:12

Singles

Personnel
Luv'
 José Hoebee – vocals
 Marga Scheide – vocals
 Patty Brard – vocals

Additional personnel
 Ernö Olah & Metropole Orkest – strings

Production
 Producer: Hans van Hemert
 Arranger/conductor: Piet Souer
 Recorded at Wisseloord and DMC Studios
 Recording engineers: Pieter Boer and John Sonneveld
 Mastering: www.pat-sound.nl

Design
 Photography: Claude Vanheye
 Design: Myosotis
 Art Direction: Clouds Studio

Charts
Luv' was more successful in the singles charts than in the album charts, at a time when the 45 PM vinyl records were popular formats (especially among youngsters in the late 1970s which represented the majority of the group's fans). That's why the chart performance of the Luv' albums was not as great as the singles ones.

True Luv' reached the gold status in the Netherlands.

References

External links
 Page about ''True Luv''' from the website Fonos.nl about the Dutch Pop Music Archives

1979 albums
Luv' albums